Tina Daheley (born ) is a British journalist, newsreader and presenter who works for the BBC, both on television and radio. She currently reads the news on The Radio 2 Breakfast Show with Zoe Ball, often contributing to discussions during the show. She is also a relief presenter on the BBC News at Ten and BBC News at Six. In 2019 she became the voiceover presenter of Points of View.

Career
Daheley joined the BBC in 2007. She has presented television coverage of women's football and co-presented the BBC Three political discussion show Free Speech, alongside Rick Edwards.

Daheley has also presented the 60 Seconds news on BBC Three, E24 on the News Channel and Revealed (BBC Two's Switch Zone). She is the former host of the 1Xtra news show, the flagship news programme for BBC Radio 1Xtra. She was the sports newsreader on BBC Radio 1's The Chris Moyles Show from February 2010 until the show ended in September 2012. She went on to host the news, sport, and weather bulletins for Radio 1 Breakfast with Nick Grimshaw from 24 September 2012, until she left Radio 1 on 10 August 2018.

Since July 2016, Daheley has been a relief presenter on BBC Breakfast and Victoria Derbyshire. In September 2016, Daheley became one of the main presenters of Crimewatch, alongside Jeremy Vine.

On Tuesday 29 May 2018, Daheley made her debut on the BBC News at Six and on Sunday, 8 July 2018, Daheley made her debut on the BBC Weekend News and the BBC News at Ten, anchoring the corporation's flagship evening news programme for the first time.

In July 2018, the BBC published updated salaries of its best-paid presenters, and Daheley was included in the list for the first time. The corporation named on-air presenters earning more than £150,000 in 2017–18. Daheley was listed as earning between £150,000–£159,999 during that year.

In January 2019, Daheley joined BBC Radio 2 to become the newsreader on The Radio 2 Breakfast Show when Zoe Ball took over as presenter from Chris Evans.She also became part of the BBC Election Night team, reading the top of the hour five minute BBC News Summary.

Personal life
She comes from a Sikh family and was brought up in Perivale, West London. She was educated at The Ellen Wilkinson School for Girls in Ealing. She studied computer science at Brunel University and went on to complete a Master's degree in journalism at the University of Leeds.

Daheley gave birth to a daughter in 2021.

References

External links

Susanna Reid, Kay Burley and Tina Daheley: Meet the election's top anchor women, Evening Standard
Election 2015: the female journalists asking the hard questions, The Guardian

BBC Radio 1 presenters
BBC Radio 2 presenters
BBC newsreaders and journalists
BBC television presenters
British women television presenters
English television journalists
English women journalists
Alumni of Brunel University London
Alumni of the University of Leeds
Living people
British women television journalists
Year of birth missing (living people)
British women radio presenters